William Lee Glasson, Jr. (born April 29, 1960) is an American professional golfer who won several tournaments on the PGA Tour.

Glasson was born in Fresno, California. He attended Oral Roberts University in Tulsa, Oklahoma where he was a member of the golf team – a two-time All-American. He turned pro in 1983 and led the PGA Tour for driving distance in 1984.

Glasson has enjoyed nine victories as a professional golfer: seven official PGA Tour events and two non-official events. His first win came at the 1985 Kemper Open. Trailing seven strokes behind the leader Larry Mize with 14 holes to play, Glasson made a 45-foot birdie putt on the 18th hole for a round of 66 to finish one stroke ahead of Mize and Corey Pavin.

Glasson won a second Kemper Open in 1992. His best finish in a major is a tie for 4th place at the 1995 U.S. Open. Glasson has over 60 top-10 PGA Tour finishes and has earned more than $6.7 million in career earnings. He was featured in the top 50 of the Official World Golf Ranking. His last win on the Tour was in 1997 at the Las Vegas Invitational.

Glasson experienced difficulty maintaining his PGA Tour privileges in his 40s, due in large part to medical problems. He needed to play some on the Nationwide Tour, where his best finish was 2nd place at the 2003 Northeast Pennsylvania Classic. Glasson has undergone at least 19 surgeries on various parts of his body including elbow, sinus, knee, lip, forearm and lower back. In 1994 Glasson said, "For me, breakfast is a bowl of Advil."

He began playing on the Champions Tour after his 50th birthday on April 29, 2010.

Glasson lives in Stillwater, Oklahoma.

Professional wins (9)

PGA Tour wins (7)

Other wins (2)
1984 Northern California Open
1989 JCPenney Classic (with Pat Bradley)

Results in major championships

CUT = missed the half-way cut
WD = withdrew
"T" = tied

Summary

Most consecutive cuts made – 5 (1984 U.S. Open – 1986 U.S. Open)
Longest streak of top-10s – 1

Results in The Players Championship

CUT = missed the halfway cut
WD = withdrew
"T" indicates a tie for a place

Results in World Golf Championships

QF, R16, R32, R64 = Round in which player lost in match play

See also
1983 PGA Tour Qualifying School graduates
1984 PGA Tour Qualifying School graduates
2004 PGA Tour Qualifying School graduates
2005 PGA Tour Qualifying School graduates

References

External links

American male golfers
Oral Roberts Golden Eagles men's golfers
PGA Tour golfers
PGA Tour Champions golfers
Golfers from California
Golfers from Oklahoma
Sportspeople from Fresno, California
People from Stillwater, Oklahoma
1960 births
Living people